Gorgasia naeocepaea, the freckled garden eel, is an eel in the family Congridae (conger/garden eels). It was described by James Erwin Böhlke in 1951, originally under the genus Taenioconger. It is a marine, tropical eel which is known from the western central Pacific Ocean, including the Philippines and Indonesia.

References

naeocepaea
Taxa named by James Erwin Böhlke
Fish described in 1951